Prunus hainanensis is a species of cherry endemic to Hainan province, China. It is very similar to Prunus campanulata and grows only at 900-1200m in the Hainan Bawangling National Nature Reserve. It has pink flowers and, accordingly, some potential as an ornamental.

References

hainanensis
Cherry blossom
Flora of Hainan
Trees of China